Miguel Carlos Diab Figoli (16 September 1920 – 20 April 1994) was a Uruguayan basketball player. He competed in the men's tournament at the 1948 Summer Olympics.

References

External links

1920 births
1994 deaths
Uruguayan men's basketball players
Olympic basketball players of Uruguay
Basketball players at the 1948 Summer Olympics
Basketball players from Buenos Aires